Julius Nyqvist (born October 29, 1992) is a Finnish ice hockey defenceman. He is currently playing for EHC Bregenzerwald in the Alps Hockey League (AlpsHL). He previously played with HIFK in the Finnish Liiga.

Nyqvist made his SM-liiga debut playing with HIFK during the 2012–13 SM-liiga season.

Outside of Finland, Nyqvist has since had spells with UK EIHL side Edinburgh Capitals and Danish clubs Gentofte Stars and Rødovre Mighty Bulls.

References

External links

1992 births
Living people
Finnish ice hockey defencemen
HIFK (ice hockey) players
Kiekko-Vantaa players
KooKoo players
Peliitat Heinola players
Edinburgh Capitals players
Gentofte Stars players
Rødovre Mighty Bulls players
Sportspeople from Vantaa
Finnish expatriate ice hockey players in Scotland
Finnish expatriate ice hockey players in Austria
Finnish expatriate ice hockey players in Denmark